Toorlestraun or Tourlestrane is a village in County Sligo, Ireland.

Village
The village of Tourlestrane itself is the smaller of the two villages in the parish of Kilmactigue, the other being Aclare. It is a market centre for local dairy farmers, and the location of the main parish church.

The townland of Clooncagh (Cluain Chatha meaning "meadow of the battle") is located near the village and known for a 15th-century battle between two warring clans.

Transport
Bus Éireann Fridays-only route 479 links the village with Sligo via Coolaney and Collooney

Gaelic games
Toorlestraun is home to one of County Sligo's most successful Gaelic Athletic Association clubs, excelling in the gaelic football scene over the last century and also in hurling in the county during the 1970s and 1980s  Since then they have excelled even more.

People
Eamonn O'Hara, GAA Toorlestraun, Sligo intercounty, and International Rules player.

See also
 List of towns and villages in Ireland

References

Towns and villages in County Sligo